Conker may refer to:

Horse chestnuts
The seed of the horse chestnut, Aesculus hippocastanum
Conkers, a traditional children's game, using the seed threaded on a string

Video games
Conker (series), a video game franchise by Rare
Conker's Pocket Tales, the first solo game in the series
Conker's Bad Fur Day, the second game in the series
Conker: Live & Reloaded, an Xbox remake of the second game 
Conker the Squirrel, the main character in the series

Other
 Conkeror, a web browser
 Conkerberry, the plant Carissa spinarum